Rex Bertram Filson (born 1930) is an Australian lichenologist who made major contributions to knowledge of lichens in Australia and Antarctica.

Early in his career Filson worked as a carpenter in various places around Australia, and from 1961 to 1963 was employed as a carpenter by the Australian Antarctic Division. This was the start of his career as a lichenologist. 

In 1964, he was employed by the Royal Botanic Gardens. Employment with the Victorian Department of Crown Lands and Survey followed (1964–1988), first as a seed-collector and finally as senior botanist. During this period, he acquired a Master of Science (1979) and a Doctor of Science (1988) from Monash University. In 1970, Filson was awarded a Churchill Fellowship to compare northern hemisphere with Australian lichens.
The National Herbarium of Victoria holds the majority of Filson's collections, over 15,000 specimens, with duplicates distributed around Australian Herbaria including AD, BRI, CANB, HO, NSW and PERTH, with several in overseas herbaria such s MSK, GZU, F and UPS.

Filson Nunatak in Antarctica is named in his honour, as is the lichen genus Filsoniana.

Standard author abbreviation

Selected taxa
An advanced search of the Mycobank database shows that he authored some 90 fungi, including:
 Buellia foecunda Filson
 Heterodea beaugleholei Filson (now Cladia beaugleholei)
Xanthoparmelia elixii  Filson

References 

Living people
1930 births
Australian lichenologists
Monash University alumni
Muelleria (journal) editors
Australian Botanical Liaison Officers